No Plan may refer to:

No Plan (owarai), Japanese comedy trio band
No Plan (EP), David Bowie
"No Plan", song by David Bowie from No Plan (EP)
No Plans, album by Australian rock band Cold Chisel 2012